The Journal of Applied Biomedicine is a peer-reviewed medical journal published quarterly by the University of South Bohemia. It covers fundamental biomedical research, clinical investigation and practice, as well as public health. The editor-in-chief is Josef Berger.

Abstracting and indexing 
This journal is abstracted and indexed by:

 Science Citation Index Expanded
 EMBASE
 Elsevier BIOBASE
 Scopus
 Chemical Abstracts Service
 Academic Search Complete
 CAB Abstracts
 Global Health

References

External links 

Publications established in 2003
General medical journals
Quarterly journals
English-language journals
University of South Bohemia in České Budějovice